In the NUTS (Nomenclature of Territorial Units for Statistics) codes of Slovakia (SK), the three levels are:

NUTS codes
SK0	Slovakia
SK01	Bratislava Region
SK010	Bratislava Region
SK02	Western Slovakia (Západné Slovensko)
SK021	Trnava Region
SK022	Trenčín Region
SK023	Nitra Region
SK03	Central Slovakia (Stredné Slovensko)
SK031	Žilina Region
SK032	Banská Bystrica Region
SK04	Eastern Slovakia (Východné Slovensko)
SK041	Prešov Region
SK042	Košice Region

Local administrative units

Below the NUTS levels, the two LAU (Local Administrative Units) levels are:

The LAU codes of Slovakia can be downloaded here:

See also
 Subdivisions of Slovakia
 ISO 3166-2 codes of Slovakia
 FIPS region codes of Slovakia

Sources
 Hierarchical list of the Nomenclature of territorial units for statistics - NUTS and the Statistical regions of Europe
 Overview map of EU Countries - NUTS level 1
 SLOVENSKÁ REPUBLIKA - NUTS level 2
 SLOVENSKÁ REPUBLIKA - NUTS level 3
 Correspondence between the NUTS levels and the national administrative units
 List of current NUTS codes
 Download current NUTS codes (ODS format)
 Regions of Slovakia, Statoids.com

Slovakia
Nuts